Karlgeorg Hoefer (6 February 1914 – 8 October 2000) was a German calligrapher and typographer. 

Hoefer was born in Schlesisch-Drehnow (now Drzonów) in Silesia. He taught typography at the Hochschule für Gestaltung Offenbach (until 1970 "Werkkunstschule Offenbach"). He held several calligraphy workshops for calligraphic societies in Los Angeles, San Francisco, Portland, Boston, Minneapolis-St. Paul, Portland and Washington. In 1987 he founded the Schreibwerkstatt-Klingspor Offenbach and supported the Klingspor Museum in Offenbach am Main.

He designed fonts for Linotype, Klingspor, and Ludwig & Mayer, including the Permanent family and Permanent Headline.

Today his most commonly seen font is the FE-Schrift, the standard font for German number plates.

He died in Offenbach in 2000.

External links 
The original Karlgeorg Hoefer Site
Schreibwerkstatt-Klingspor Offenbach
Hoefer's page at Linotype.com

1914 births
2000 deaths
People from the Province of Silesia
German typographers and type designers
German calligraphers